Marion Dell Lyman (July 9, 1918 – December 19, 1986) was a player in the National Football League.

Biography
Lyman was born on July 9, 1918 in Aberdeen, Washington. He played football at Fairfax High School in Los Angeles and UCLA, lettering as a sophomore, junior and senior (1938-40) despite missing most of his senior season due to an appendectomy.

Career
Lyman was drafted by the Green Bay Packers in the fourteenth round of the 1941 NFL Draft and split that season between the Packers and the Cleveland Rams. After two seasons away from the NFL while serving in the military, he once again played with the Rams during the 1944 NFL season.

See also
List of Green Bay Packers players

References

1918 births
1986 deaths
People from Aberdeen, Washington
Green Bay Packers players
Cleveland Rams players
Los Angeles Rams players
UCLA Bruins football players